The 1987 French Open was a tennis tournament that took place on the outdoor clay courts at the Stade Roland Garros in Paris, France. The tournament was held from 25 May until 7 June. It was the 91st staging of the French Open, and the second Grand Slam tennis event of 1987.

The event was part of the 1987 Nabisco Grand Prix and 1987 Virginia Slims World Championship Series.

Finals

Men's singles

 Ivan Lendl defeated  Mats Wilander, 7–5, 6–2, 3–6, 7–6(7–3).
It was Lendl's 2nd title of the year, and his 64th overall. It was his 5th career Grand Slam title, and his 3rd French Open title.

Women's singles

 Steffi Graf defeated  Martina Navratilova, 6–4, 4–6, 8–6.
It was Graf's 1st career Grand Slam title.

Men's doubles

 Anders Järryd /  Robert Seguso defeated  Guy Forget /  Yannick Noah, 6–7, 6–7, 6–3, 6–4, 6–2.

Women's doubles

 Martina Navratilova /  Pam Shriver defeated  Steffi Graf /  Gabriela Sabatini, 6–2, 6–1.

Mixed doubles

 Pam Shriver /  Emilio Sánchez Vicario defeated  Lori McNeil /  Sherwood Stewart, 6–3, 7–6(7-4).

Prize money

Total prize money for the event was FF19,948,960.

References

External links
 French Open official website